The 2015–16 Ukrainian Hockey Extra League season was the 24th season of the Ukrainian Hockey Championship, and the first since the league was named Ukrainian Hockey Extra League. Eight teams participated in the league this season, but it was long uncertain which teams that would participate because of the instability in Ukraine and that some of the clubs have economic issues. HK Donbass won both the regular season and the playoffs.

Regular season 
Below is the regular season table.

Play-off 
Play-off schedule and results are shown below.

References

Ukrainian Hockey Championship seasons
Ukrainian Hockey Championship
Ukr